Champa Sugathadasa (born 10 November 1973) is a Sri Lankan former cricketer. She played eight Women's One Day International matches for Sri Lanka women's national cricket team. She was part of Sri Lanka's squad for the 2000 Women's Cricket World Cup.

References

External links
 

1973 births
Living people
Sri Lankan women cricketers
Sri Lanka women One Day International cricketers
Cricketers from Colombo